The 2012–13 season was the 130th season in Bristol Rovers' history and their 86th in the Football League. Rovers once again competed in League Two, the lowest level of the Football League, after finishing 13th in the 2011–12 season.

Bristol Rovers met Fleetwood Town for the first time in their history after their promotion from the Conference National. They also played at Rotherham United's New York Stadium and Chesterfield's Proact Stadium for the first time.

Having been bottom of League Two and real contenders to be relegated out of The Football League at the midway point in the season, they went on to win 12 of the final 23 games to steer well clear of the relegation zone and even, briefly, became contenders to reach the play-offs. In the end, Rovers finished 14th, nine points from both the play-offs and relegation zone. The upturn in form coincided with the return of John Ward to the managerial position at Rovers, replacing Mark McGhee who was sacked in December.

Season events

May
  – Goalkeeper Conor Gough joined Rovers from Charlton Athletic on a two-year contract.
  – Ellis Harrison, Mitch Harding, Jordan Goddard and Ross Staley were all awarded professional contracts.
  – Defender Gary Sawyer signed a two-year contract with League One side Leyton Orient after rejecting Rovers' offer of a new deal.
  – Rovers announced that 10 players would be released upon completion of their contracts at the end of June. Among them was Byron Anthony who had been with the club since 2006.
  – Jim Paterson agreed a new one-year deal at Rovers.

June
  – Danny Woodards verbally agreed a new contract with Rovers.
  – Young winger Shaquille Hunter agreed to sign his first professional contract with Bristol Rovers despite rumoured interest from Manchester City, Liverpool and Fulham.

July
  – Craig Stanley's contract at Rovers was terminated by mutual consent.
  – Goalkeeping coach Carl Emberson left for Luton Town joining up with former boss Paul Buckle as assistant manager.
  – Midfielder Oliver Norburn rejoins Rovers, signing a one-year contract. Wayne Brown signed a new six-month contract.
  – Northern Ireland Under-21 international Seanan Clucas signed for Rovers on a one-year contract.
  – Youth Team Coach Jamie Fullarton left Rovers to take up a youth coaching role at Crystal Palace.
  – Defender Lee Brown signed a contract extension that would keep him at the club until 2014.
  – Planning permission for Rovers' proposed 21,700 all seater stadium in Frenchay was approved by South Gloucestershire Council with councillors voting 11 to 1 in favour.
  – Former Rovers striker Marcus Stewart rejoined the club as Youth Development Coach.
  – Stoke City midfielder Matthew Lund rejoined Rovers on a six-month loan deal.
  – Rovers agree to sign Faroese international defender Rógvi Baldvinsson from Ålgård FK for an undisclosed fee. Former Bristol City striker David Clarkson agreed a two-year deal with Rovers.
  – Scotland international defender Garry Kenneth agreed a three-year deal with Rovers.

August
  – Winger Mustapha Carayol left for Championship side Middlesbrough for an undisclosed fee believed to be around £300,000.
  – Chris Zebroski left Rovers after one season, joining fellow League Two side Cheltenham Town.
  – Rógvi Baldvinsson announced that he was to return to Norway and not joining Rovers, citing personal reasons.
  – German midfielder Fabian Broghammer signed for Rovers after playing a number of pre-season games while on trial.
  – Chelsea goalkeeper Sam Walker joined on loan until January. Rovers are knocked out of the League Cup in the first round by Ipswich Town.
  – Rovers agreed the permanent signing of defender Tom Parkes from Leicester City.
  – Former England goalkeeper Dave Beasant joined Rovers as part-time goalkeeping coach.
  – Rovers submit an official complaint to the Football League over the circumstances which led to the match with Wycombe Wanderers being abandoned after 66 minutes with Rovers leading 3–1.
  – Defender Cian Bolger joined Rovers on loan until January from Leicester City. Bolger had previously played for Rovers on loan in the past two seasons.

September
  – Yeovil Town knock Rovers out of the Football League Trophy in the first round.
  – Fulham goalkeeper Neil Etheridge joins Rovers on a one-month loan deal.
  – Striker Tom Eaves joins Rovers on loan from Bolton Wanderers for three months. Former Scotland international Derek Riordan signed on a short-term deal until Christmas. Riordan is currently on bail and is due to go on trial on 9 October over an alleged assault in an Edinburgh nightclub.

October
  – Midfielder Jordan Goddard and forward Mitch Harding join Gloucester City on loan for one month.
  – Neil Etheridge's loan from Fulham was extended to 20 December.
  – Jordan Goddard & Mitch Harding extend their loan deals with Gloucester City for another month.

November
  – Tom Curtis is appointed Director of the Youth Academy at Rovers, leaving his job as head coach of the Antigua and Barbuda national team in the process.
  – Sheffield United come from behind to beat Rovers 2–1 in the FA Cup first round. The result meant that Rovers had failed to win a single cup game this season. However, all three cup matches were against higher division sides.
  – On loan goalkeeper Neil Etheridge was recalled by parent club Fulham.
  – Guy Branston joined on a month-long loan deal from Aldershot Town.

December
  – Midfielder Wayne Brown rejected a contract extension, opting to re-join Finnish side TPS.
  – Manager Mark McGhee was relieved of his duties following the 4–1 away defeat to York City. It followed a run of 10 games with only one win and one draw leaving the club 23rd in League Two.
  – Former Bristol City, Cheltenham Town, Carlisle United and Colchester United manager John Ward was appointed Bristol Rovers manager for the second time, initially until the end of the season with a view to a contract extension upon its completion. His first spell in charge was between 1993 and 1996 and included a trip to Wembley Stadium in the 1995 Second Division Play-Off Final.
  – Derek Riordan was officially released by Rovers on completion of his contract after new manager John Ward confirmed he had returned to Scotland on Christmas Eve.
  – Rovers agreed one-month loan deals with Queens Park Rangers and Colchester United for Tom Hitchcock and John-Joe O'Toole starting 1 January. Rovers also signed goalkeeper Steve Mildenhall from Millwall on an emergency loan which would be extended "as soon as possible".

January
  – Defender Mark McChrystal joined on a short-term deal from Tranmere Rovers after having a bid for Cian Bolger turned down by Leicester City.
  – Plans to build a Sainsbury's store on the Memorial Stadium site were approved. This allowed Rovers to proceed with plans to build the proposed UWE Stadium.
  – Port Vale defender Clayton McDonald joined on an emergency loan.
  – Stoke City forward Ryan Brunt joined Rovers on a two and a half year deal.

February
  – Defender Tom Parkes was named League Two Player of the Month for January by the Football League. Manager John Ward was nominated for January's League Two Manager of the Month but lost out to Martin Allen manager of Gillingham, the only side to score any points against Rovers in January.
  – French striker Oumare Tounkara signed for Rovers on a deal until the end of the season.

March
  – Stuart Naylor was appointed new full-time goalkeeping coach until the end of the season, replacing Dave Beasant who was previously in the role part-time.

April
  – Defender Michael Smith signed a new two-year deal with Rovers.
  – Striker Matt Harrold agreed a new one-year deal at Rovers with the option of a further year extension.
  – John Ward agreed to a new one year rolling contract. Eurocams were announced as new home shirt sponsors and Highspec Travel Services as new away shirt sponsors. Second year scholars Josh Southway and Pat Keary signed one year contracts while first year scholar Jamie Lucas signed a two-year contract.
  – Assistant manager Shaun North left Rovers with immediate effect, development coach Marcus Stewart took over the role for the final game of the season. Alefein Santos signed his first professional deal with Rovers.
  – Jim Paterson signed a one-year contract extension having triggered a clause in his previous contract.
  – Rovers finish the season in 14th place on 60 points.
  – It was confirmed that winger Joe Anyinsah would be released upon completion of his contract.
  – Defender Mark McChrystal agreed a two-year contract with Rovers.

First team
As of 27 April 2013.

Transfers

In

Out

Squad statistics

Appearances, goals and cards
As of 27 April 2013

Top scorers

End-of-season awards

Competitions

Overall

League Two

Standings

Results summary

Results by round

Scores Overview 
Bristol Rovers score given first.

Matches

Preseason friendlies

League Two

August

September

October

November

December

January

February

March

April

League Cup

Football League Trophy

FA Cup

See also
2012–13 in English football
2012–13 Football League Two
List of Bristol Rovers F.C. seasons

References

External links
 Bristol Rovers F.C.
 The Post Newspaper
 BBC Sport
 Sky Sports
 Soccerbase: ResultsStatsTransfers

Bristol Rovers F.C. seasons
Bristol Rovers